Elävien kirjoihin (translation: Into the books of the living) is the ninth studio album by the Finnish thrash metal band Mokoma. The album was released through Sakara Records on February 6, 2015, and was produced by Janne Saksa. The album peaked on the top position of The Official Finnish Charts.

Track listings

Personnel
 Kuisma Aalto – guitar, backing vocals
 Marko Annala – vocals
 Janne Hyrkäs – drums
 Santtu Hämäläinen – bass
 Tuomo Saikkonen – guitar, backing vocals

References 

2015 albums
Mokoma albums